Warren Montabone (28 June 1903 – 27 September 1999) was a Canadian hurdler. He competed in the men's 110 metres hurdles at the 1924 Summer Olympics.

References

External links
 

1903 births
1999 deaths
Athletes (track and field) at the 1924 Summer Olympics
Athletes (track and field) at the 1928 Summer Olympics
Canadian male hurdlers
Olympic track and field athletes of Canada
Sportspeople from Grand Rapids, Michigan